Dinnerstein is a surname. Notable people with the surname include:

Dorothy Dinnerstein (1923–1992), American feminist 
Harvey Dinnerstein (1928–2022), American figurative artist and educator
Leonard Dinnerstein (1934–2019), American historian
Simon Dinnerstein (born 1943), American figurative artist and educator
Simone Dinnerstein (born 1972), American classical pianist